
William, Bill, Billy, Willie or Will Mackinnon, MacKinnon or McKinnon may refer to:

Politicians
William Alexander Mackinnon (Dunwich MP) (1789–1870), British politician and South Australia colonisation commissioner
William Alexander Mackinnon (Lymington MP) (1813–1903), British politician
William S. McKinnon (1852–1908), American politician in Ohio
William F. MacKinnon (1919–1990), Canadian politician
Bill McKinnon (politician) (born 1933), Scottish-born Australian member of the Tasmanian House of Assembly

Military
Sir William Alexander Mackinnon (British Army officer) (1830–1897), Director-General of British Army Medical Services
Sir William Henry Mackinnon (1852–1929), British Army general

Sportsmen
Billy MacKinnon (1852–1942), Scottish footballer for Queen's Park and Scotland national team in 1870s
William McKinnon (footballer, born 1859) (1859–1899), Scottish footballer for Dumbarton and Scotland national team in 1880s
Willie MacKinnon, American player in 1974 College Division East for Vermont Catamounts men's ice hockey#All-Americans
Will MacKinnon, American gold medalist in Ice hockey at the 2016 Winter Youth Olympics#Events

Others
Sir William Mackinnon, 1st Baronet (1823–1893), Scottish ship-owner and businessman
, Uganda Railway Lake Victoria ferry named after him
William MacKinnon (minister) (1843–1925), minister and Moderator of the Free Church of Scotland
Bill McKinnon (public servant) (1931–1988), Australian Secretary of Department of Immigration and Ethnic Affairs
William P. MacKinnon (born 1939), American historian of Mormons and Utah